Word of Life can refer to:
Word of Life Fellowship, headquartered in Schroon Lake, New York
Word of Life Christian Church, in New Hartford, New York
Kale Heywet Word of Life Church, church in Ethiopia
Livets Ord (Swedish for "Word of Life"), a church founded by Ulf Ekman
Born Again Movement  (From the subtitle of Yalin Xin's book) Large Asian House-Church Network/Fellowship
Word of Life Bible Church, headquartered in Warri, Nigeria
Word of Life, mural on the side of the Hesburgh Library at the Notre Dame University
SYME